The 2017 Copa Colombia, officially the 2017 Copa Águila for sponsorship reasons, was the 15th edition of the Copa Colombia, the national cup competition for clubs of DIMAYOR. The tournament was contested by 36 teams, beginning on 8 March and ending on 8 November. Junior were the champions, winning their second title by beating Independiente Medellín 3–1 on aggregate in the final, and qualified for the 2018 Copa Libertadores. Atlético Nacional were the defending champions, but were eliminated by Patriotas in the quarterfinals.

Format
The competition continued under the format used since the 2015 edition, however, starting from this edition the winner will be entitled to a berth to the next Copa Libertadores instead of the Copa Sudamericana as it had been since 2008. The first stage was played by 32 teams, which were split into eight groups of four teams each on a regional basis, where teams played each other of the teams in their group twice. The 8 group winners plus the best 4 second-placed teams joined four of the teams qualified for the 2017 Copa Libertadores (Atlético Nacional, Independiente Medellín, Santa Fe, and Millonarios) in the round of 16, from where the cup continued on a home-and-away knockout basis.

Group stage

Group A

Group B

Group C

Group D

Group E

Group F

Group G

Group H

Ranking of second-placed teams
The four best teams among those ranked second qualified for the knockout stage.

Knockout stage
Each tie in the knockout stage was played in a home-and-away two-legged format. In each tie, the team which had the better overall record up to that stage hosted the second leg, except in the round of 16 where the group winners automatically hosted the second leg. In case of a tie in aggregate score, neither the away goals rule nor extra time are applied, and the tie is decided by a penalty shoot-out. Atlético Nacional, Independiente Medellin, Santa Fe, and Millonarios entered the competition in the Round of 16, being joined there by the eight group winners and the four best second-placed teams.

Bracket

Round of 16
First legs: July 5, 12 and 13; Second legs: July 26, 27, August 2 and 3. Group winners (Team 2) hosted the second leg.

|}

Quarterfinals
First legs: August 9, 10 and 23; Second legs: August 23, 24 and 30. Team 2 hosted the second leg.

|}

Semifinals
First legs: September 14 and October 8; Second legs: September 27 and October 11. Team 2 hosted the second leg.

|}

Final
First leg: October 18; Second leg: November 8. Team 2 hosted the second leg.

|}

Top goalscorers

Source: Resultados.com

See also
 2017 Categoría Primera A season
 2017 Categoría Primera B season

References

External links 
  

Copa Colombia seasons
1